Dzoragyugh, is a village in the Lori Province of Armenia.

Development programs 
In 2015 some programs started to be implemented in Dzoragyugh by Children of Armenia Fund. Crafts Clubs, Music and Dance Clubs, Support to Children with Learning Difficulties, Health and Lifestyle Education, School Nutrition & Brushodromes, Women Health Screenings, Support for Reproductive Health were implemented in the village. Playground, Cafeteria and Brushodrome were created and renovated in the village by COAF.
On October 18, 2021, the Preschool in Dzoragyugh Village was re-opened and renamed The Siranush Harutyunyan Preschool in Dzoragyugh Lori Region.

See also 
 Lori province
 Children of Armenia Fund

References

Populated places in Lori Province